The Ashuelot Covered Bridge is a historic wooden covered bridge over the Ashuelot River on Bolton Road, just south of its intersection with NH 119 in Ashuelot, an unincorporated village of Winchester, New Hampshire.  Built in 1864-65, it is one of the state's few surviving 19th-century covered bridges.  It was listed on the National Register of Historic Places in 1981.

Description and history
The Ashuelot Covered Bridge is located in western Winchester, at the center of Ashuelot Village. It is a Town lattice truss bridge, spanning the Ashuelot River in a roughly north-south orientation. The bridge rests on stone abutments and a central pier. The abutments have been reinforced with concrete since the bridge was built, and the central pier has been protected by a metal breakwater. The bridge passes 11'7" over the water. One unusual feature of this bridge is that its sides are not fully sheathed, the usual means by which the truss elements are protected from the elements. Instead, the bridge roof is extended to provide long eaves, and the sides are sheathed to the height of the walkway handrails.

A bridge was already standing at this site when the town of Winchester first began considering construction of a replacement in 1853.  A new bridge was finally approved in 1864, and the present structure was opened the next year, having cost $4,650 to build.  Portions of the old bridge were apparently used in its construction, since older beams were found in it during repairs made after the New England Hurricane of 1938.  The bridge was the principal means of access between the village railroad station (located near its southern abutment) and the village proper on the north bank.

See also

List of New Hampshire covered bridges
List of bridges on the National Register of Historic Places in New Hampshire
National Register of Historic Places listings in Cheshire County, New Hampshire

References

External links

Ashuelot Bridge, NH Division of Historical Resources

Covered bridges on the National Register of Historic Places in New Hampshire
Bridges completed in 1864
Tourist attractions in Cheshire County, New Hampshire
Bridges in Cheshire County, New Hampshire
National Register of Historic Places in Cheshire County, New Hampshire
Road bridges on the National Register of Historic Places in New Hampshire
Wooden bridges in New Hampshire
Lattice truss bridges in the United States
Winchester, New Hampshire